The Ninth Army was a field army of the United States Army, garrisoned at Caserma Ederle, Vicenza, Italy. It is the United States Army Service Component Command of United States Africa Command (USAFRICOM or AFRICOM).

Activated just eight weeks before the June 1944 Normandy landings, the Ninth Army was one of the main U.S. Army combat commands used during the campaign in Northwest Europe in 1944 and 1945. It was commanded at its inception by Lieutenant General William Simpson. It had been designated Eighth Army, but on arrival in the United Kingdom it was renamed to avoid confusion with the famous British formation of the same designation, taking the name of a unit of the fictitious First United States Army Group prepared for Operation Quicksilver. All American field armies in the European Theatre of Operation were designated with odd numbers; even numbered field armies served in the Pacific Theatre of Operations.

History

The first responsibility for Ninth Army, upon its arrival on 5 September was to take part in the final reduction of the German forces holding out in the French port of Brest. After the surrender of the town fifteen days later, Ninth Army was sent east to take its place in the line. It came into the line between Third Army and First Army.

In November, Ninth Army was shifted to the very northern flank of 12th Army Group. It undertook operations to close the front up to the Roer River. 16 December saw the opening of the last great German offensive of the war, the Battle of the Bulge. Ninth Army was isolated from the headquarters of 12th Army Group, and it was thus placed (on 20 December) under the command of General Bernard Montgomery's 21st Army Group along with First Army, despite opposition from General Omar Bradley. Simpson reoriented his command quickly to help in the reduction of the salient that the Germans had created. Many of Ninth Army's units passed to the command of First Army, which was doing the main work of reducing the German salient from the north. In the meantime, the remainder of Ninth Army continued to hold the line along the Roer. When First Army and Third Army had finished reducing the salient, First Army returned to the command of 12th Army Group, but Ninth Army remained under the command of 21st Army Group for the remainder of the Rhineland Campaign.

In late February 1945 the Ninth Army launched Operation Grenade, which was the southern prong of a pincer attack coordinated with Canadian First Army's Operation Veritable, with the purpose of closing the front up to the Rhine. By 10 March, the Rhine had been reached in all sectors of Ninth Army's front. It was not until after 20 March that Ninth Army units first crossed the Rhine itself (Operation Flashpoint). However, after doing so, the Army quickly struck east around the north of the Ruhr. An enormous pocket soon formed containing the German Army Group B under Walter Model. By 4 April, Ninth Army had reached the Weser and was switched back to 12th Army Group.

The end was now clearly in sight, and as part of Ninth Army, along with the newly arrived Fifteenth Army, reduced the enormous Ruhr Pocket, other elements reached the Elbe on 12 April. On 2 May 1945, the whole of Ninth Army's front reached the agreed demarcation point with the Russians, and the advance ceased. Around 7 May 1945, the Ninth Army accepted around 100,000 prisoners from the German Twelfth Army under General Walther Wenck, and the German Ninth Army (Germany) under General Theodor Busse.

Units
Units included the 2nd Infantry Division, the 8th Infantry Division, 8th Armored Division, the 2nd Ranger Battalion, the 5th Ranger Battalion, the 29th Infantry Division, the 30th Infantry Division, the 6th Armored Division, the 104th Infantry Division, the 7th Armored Division, and the 79th Infantry Division .

Reactivation
In 2012, U.S. Army Africa was re-designated as US Army Africa (Ninth Army) under the Army modularization program.

Following its reformation the army controlled, and continues to control, the following units;

 United States Army Africa Headquarters and Headquarters Battalion, Caserma Carlo Ederle, Italy
 207th Military Intelligence Brigade (Operational Control)
 1st Infantry Division (Aligned), Fort Riley, Kansas
 2nd Brigade Combat Team, 2nd Infantry Division (Aligned), Fort Riley, Kansas
 82nd Civil Affairs Battalion, Fort Stewart, Georgia
 OUA Division, Liberia
 Engineering Brigade, Liberia
In 2020, U.S. Army Africa will merge with U.S. Army Europe to form a new command, U.S. Army Europe-Africa.

See also 
Operation Queen
Operation Plunder

Notes

References 
 The Struggle for Europe; Chester Wilmot

External links
 Interviews with William Hood Simpson. 30 June 1976, 7 July 1976, University of Texas at San Antonio: Institute of Texan Cultures: Oral History Collection, UA 15.01, University of Texas at San Antonio Libraries Special Collections.

009 Army
Military units and formations established in 1944